Rich Mountain may refer to the following:

Mountains in the United States:
Rich Mountain (Georgia)
Rich Mountain (Watauga County, North Carolina), NW of Boone, Watauga County, NC
Rich Mountain (Moses Cone Park, North Carolina), SSW of Boone, Watauga County, NC
Rich Mountain Bald (Watauga County, North Carolina), NNW of Boone, Watauga County, NC
Rich Mountain (Virginia) in the state of Virginia
Rich Mountain (Tygart Valley River) bordering the Tygart Valley River in western Randolph County, West Virginia
Rich Mountain (Arkansas–Oklahoma) (2,160 ft/800 m) straddling the Arkansas–Oklahoma state border

Other:
Rich Mountain (Frederick, Maryland), a house on the National Register of Historic Places near Frederick, Maryland

See also
Battle of Rich Mountain, West Virginia